Razzle may refer to:

 Razzle (game), a carnival game
 Razzle (magazine), a British soft porn magazine
 Razzle (musician) (1960–1984), former drummer of Hanoi Rocks
 Razzle, the precursor to the band Lit
 Razzle, the fictional dog in the BBC children's television series Jonny Briggs
 Razzles, a type of candy

See also
 Razzle Dazzle (disambiguation)